Rupert William Simon Allason (born 8 November 1951) is a British former Conservative Party politician and professional author. He was the Member of Parliament (MP) for Torbay in Devon, from 1987 to 1997. He writes books and articles on the subject of espionage under the pen name Nigel West.

Background
Born in London, Allason and his brother, Julian, were brought up as Roman Catholics, the faith of their Irish mother, Nuala (who acted under the names Nuala McElveen and Nuala Barrie), daughter of John A. McArevey, of Foxrock, Dublin. The boys attended Downside School. Their father, James Allason, was also a Conservative Party MP, descended from the architect Thomas Allason.

Political career
Allason contested Kettering in 1979 and Battersea in 1983 before being elected as Conservative MP for Torbay in 1987.

He was opposed to ceding greater power to Brussels; in 1993 he was the only Conservative to refuse to vote for the Maastricht Treaty when it was made into a motion of confidence. The vote was narrowly won, but Allason's abstention caused him to have the party whip withdrawn for a year.

He left parliament after the landslide 1997 general election in which he lost his seat to Liberal Democrat Adrian Sanders. He is widely considered to have lost because he failed to tip a pub waitress a week before polling day. As a consequence, fourteen waiters who were going to vote for Allason switched to the Liberal Democrats. He lost by twelve votes.

In 2000, Allason was reported to have considered joining the UK Independence Party (UKIP). The author Jon Ronson, in the first chapter of his book Them: Adventures With Extremists, briefly analysed Allason's career and character, with particular emphasis on his 1997 electoral loss.

Literary career

As an author, Allason has concentrated on security and intelligence issues and his controversial books have frequently made headlines. He was voted 'The Experts' Expert' by a panel of other spy writers in The Observer in November 1989. In 1984 The Sunday Times commented: "His information is so precise that many people believe he is the unofficial historian of the secret services. West's sources are undoubtedly excellent. His books are peppered with deliberate clues to potential front-page stories."

Allason has been a frequent speaker at intelligence seminars and has lectured at both the KGB headquarters in Dzerzhinsky Square, Moscow and at the CIA headquarters in Langley, Virginia, where he once addressed an audience that included the Soviet spy Aldrich Ames. He continues to lecture to members of the intelligence community at the Centre for Counterintelligence and Security Studies in Washington, D.C.

His special contribution to the study of modern historical espionage has been in tracking down former agents and persuading them to tell their stories. He traced the wartime double agent GARBO, who was reported to have died in Africa in 1949. However, Allason found him in Venezuela, and they collaborated on the book Operation Garbo, published in 1985.

He was also the first person to identify and interview the mistress of Admiral Canaris, the German intelligence chief who headed the Abwehr, and he was responsible for the exposure of Leo Long and Edward Scott as Soviet spies.

His titles include The Crown Jewels, based on files made available to him by the KGB archives in Moscow; VENONA, which disclosed the existence of a GRU spy-ring operating in London throughout the war, allegedly headed by Professor JBS Haldane and the Hon. Ivor Montagu; and The Third Secret, an account of the CIA's intervention in Afghanistan. Mortal Crimes, published in September 2004, investigates the scale of Soviet espionage in the Manhattan Project, the Anglo-American development of an atomic bomb.

In 2005 he edited The Guy Liddell Diaries, a daily journal of the wartime work of MI5's Director of Counter-Espionage. He also published a study of the Comintern's secret wireless traffic, MASK: MI5's Penetration of the Communist Party of Great Britain, and the first of a series of counter-intelligence textbooks, The Historical Dictionary of British Intelligence, The Historical Dictionary of International Intelligence and The Historical Dictionary of Cold War Counter-Intelligence.

In his 2018 book, Cold War Spymaster: A Legacy of Guy Liddell, Deputy Director of MI5, the author did not suggest that Liddell had passed secrets to the Soviets, as had been claimed by some other authors, including John Costello in his Mask of Treachery. In fact, West stated that Liddell "was betrayed by Burgess, Blunt and Philby", according to a 2019 summary of the book.

Legal actions
Allason has been involved in a number of legal cases, in each of which he represented himself without lawyers. While in the House of Commons, he campaigned against the use of public-interest immunity certificates, and exposed the arms-dealing activities of the publisher and thief Robert Maxwell. He was sued for libel by Maxwell but won the case, winning record damages for a litigant in person by counterclaim.

In 1996 Allason sued Alastair Campbell for malicious falsehood with regard to an article printed in the Daily Mirror in November 1992. The case was heard by Mr Justice Drake, without a jury. The judge ruled that Allason had failed to demonstrate that the Daily Mirror article, although inaccurate, had caused him any financial loss. In a retrial in 1998, he was awarded £1,050 in damages and 75% of his legal costs.

In 1998, Allason lost a libel action – his 18th – against the authors and publishers of the Have I Got News For You 1997 diary for referring to him as "a conniving little shit".

In 2001, Allason sued Random House, the publishers of The Enigma Spy, the autobiography of the former Soviet agent John Cairncross. Allason claimed he had ghostwritten The Enigma Spy in return for the copyright and 50 per cent of the proceeds. However, Allason lost the case and was ordered to pay costs of around £200,000. The trial judge, Mr Justice Laddie, described him as "one of the most dishonest witnesses I have ever seen".

Honours and awards
Allason is the recipient of the US Association of Former Intelligence Officers (AFIO)'s Lifetime Literature Achievement Award, and in 2011 he was elected to the Honorary Board of that association. He is the European Editor of the World Intelligence Review, published in Washington D.C.

Personal life 
In 1979 Allason married Nikki van Moppes. They divorced in 1996. The couple have two children, the elder of whom is entrepreneur Tom Allason.

In the 1970s, Allason began practising Transcendental Meditation.

In 2012 Allason married the violinist Nicola Loud.

Publications
Spy! (by Richard Deacon with Nigel West), London: British Broadcasting Corporation, 1980
MI5: British Security Service Operations, 1909–1945, New York: Stein and Day, 1982, 1981
A Matter of Trust: MI5, 1945–72, London: Weidenfeld and Nicolson, 1982; published in the U.S. as The Circus: MI5, Operations 1945–1972, New York : Stein and Day, 1983
MI6: British Secret Intelligence Service Operations: 1909–45, London: Weidenfeld and Nicolson, 1983
Unreliable Witness: Espionage Myths of the Second World War, London: Weidenfeld and Nicolson, 1984
The Branch: A History of the Metropolitan Police Special Branch (By Rupert Allason)
Operation Garbo: The Personal Story of the Most Successful Double Agent of World War II, co-written by Juan Pujol and Nigel West, London: Weidenfeld and Nicolson, 1985
GCHQ: The Secret Wireless War, 1900–86, London: Weidenfeld and Nicolson, 1986, 
Molehunt: The Full Story of the Soviet Spy in MI5, London: Weidenfeld and Nicolson, 1987
The Friends: Britain's Post-War Secret Intelligence operations, London: Weidenfeld and Nicolson, 1988
Games of Intelligence: The Classified Conflict of International Espionage, London: Weidenfeld and Nicolson, 1989
The Blue List (novel), London: Secker & Warburg, 1989, 
Cuban Bluff (novel), London: Secker & Warburg, 1990
Seven Spies Who Changed the World, London: Secker & Warburg, 1991
Secret War: The Story of SOE, Britain's Wartime Sabotage Organisation, London: Hodder & Stoughton, 1992
Murder in the Commons (novel), London: 1992
The Faber Book of Espionage: Faber & Faber, December 1994
Murder in the Lords (novel), London: 1994
The Secret War for the Falklands: SAS, MI6 and the War Whitehall Nearly Lost: Little Brown, January 1997, 
Introduction to British Security Co-ordination: British Intelligence in the Americas, 1940-45: Little Brown, 1998
The Faber Book of Treachery: Faber & Faber, March 1998
The Crown Jewels: The British Secrets Exposed by the KGB Archives, London: HarperCollins, 1999, 1998
Counterfeit Spies: Time Warner Paperbacks, March 1999
VENONA: The Greatest Secret of the Cold War: HarperCollins, May 2000 
The Third Secret: The CIA, Solidarity and the KGB's Plot to Kill the Pope: HarperCollins, October 2000
Mortal Crimes: The Greatest Theft in History: Soviet Penetration of the Manhattan Project, New York: Enigma Books, 2004
The Guy Liddell Diaries: 1939–1942 Volume 1: Frank Cass Publishers, February 2005
The Guy Liddell Diaries: 1942–1945 Volume 2: Routledge, London, June 2005
Historical Dictionary of British Intelligence: Scarecrow Press, London, June 2005
Mask: MI5's Penetration of the Communist Party of Great Britain: Frank Cass Publishers, July 2005
On Her Majesty's Secret Service: The Chiefs of Britain's Intelligence Agency, MI6: Greenhill Books, London October 2006

References

External links
 Nigel West
 Centre for Counterintelligence and Security Studies
 Association of Former Intelligence Officers

1951 births
Living people
British historians
English people of Irish descent
Conservative Party (UK) MPs for English constituencies
People educated at Downside School
UK MPs 1987–1992
UK MPs 1992–1997
British historians of espionage
British Eurosceptics